Saint Joseph's Catholic Academy is a Catholic high school located in Boalsburg, Pennsylvania, near State College. It is located in the Roman Catholic Diocese of Altoona-Johnstown.

Background
Saint Joseph's Catholic Academy, also abbreviated as SJCA, was founded in 2011 to serve students in the State College area.  It graduated its first senior class in 2014.

Athletics
Saint Joseph's Catholic Academy had a PIAA District 6, Class A football team. As of July 2018, this football team was suspended.

St. Joseph's currently has a variety of sports teams: soccer, basketball, indoor and outdoor track and field, volleyball, golf, cross country, and baseball. SJCA competes in PIAA District 6 Class A, with the exception of track and field, which competes in class AA. Starting in the 2022-2023 school year, they will join the Tri-Valley Athletic Association. 

The St. Joseph's girls cross country team has won the Class A PIAA State Cross Country Championship three times: in 2016, 2017, and 2019. Their boys' soccer team won the District 6 A Championship in 2021.

Notes and references

External links
 Official website
 The Roman Catholic Diocese of Altoona

Catholic secondary schools in Pennsylvania
Educational institutions established in 2011
Schools in Centre County, Pennsylvania
2011 establishments in Pennsylvania